Frederick Gayles (born May 11, 1966) is a former Arena football wide receiver/linebacker in the Arena Football League (AFL). He played college football at Western State Colorado University.

In 2002, Gayles was elected into the Arena Football Hall of Fame.

References

1966 births
Living people
American football wide receivers
American football linebackers
Western Colorado Mountaineers football players
Denver Dynamite (arena football) players
Albany Firebirds players
New York CityHawks players
Grand Rapids Rampage players
Players of American football from Denver